Uridine phosphorylase 1 is an enzyme that in humans is encoded by the UPP1 gene.

Interactions
UPP1 has been shown to interact with Vimentin.

Interactive pathway map

References

Further reading

External links 
 PDBe-KB provides an overview of all the structure information available in the PDB for Human Uridine phosphorylase 1 (UPP1)